This is a list of aircraft used by the Royal Hungarian Air Force (MKHL) during World War II. During the war, Hungary fought as part of the Axis powers on the Eastern Front, although they did participate in the Invasion of Yugoslavia.

Fighters 

 Dornier Do 215
 Fiat CR.30
 Fiat CR.32
 Fiat CR.42 Falco
 Focke-Wulf Fw 190
 Heinkel He 112
 MÁVAG Héja
 Messerschmitt Bf 109
 Messerschmitt Bf 110
 Messerschmitt Me 210
 Messerschmitt Me 410
 Reggiane Re.2000
 Varga RMI-1 X/H
 Weiss Manfréd WM-23 Ezüst Nyíl

Bombers 

 Caproni Ca.135
 Dornier Do 23
 Dornier Do 215
Fiat BR.20 Cicogna
Heinkel He 45
Heinkel He 46
 Heinkel He 111
 Junkers Ju 86
Junkers Ju 87
Junkers Ju 88
Varga RMI-1 X/H
Weiss Manfréd WM-16 Budapest
Weiss Manfréd WM-21 Sólyom

Attackers 

 Focke-Wulf Fw 190
 Henschel Hs 129
 Messerschmitt Bf 110
 Messerschmitt Me 210
 Messerschmitt Me 410

Reconnaissance 

 Caproni Ca.310
 Fieseler Fi 156 Storch
 Focke-Wulf Fw 189 Uhu 
 Heinkel He 70 Blitz 
 IMAM Ro.37 
 Weiss Manfréd WM-16 Budapest 
 Weiss Manfréd WM-21 Sólyom

Trainers 
Arado Ar 96
Breda Ba.25
Bücker Bü 131 Jungmann
Bücker Bü 133 Jungmeister
Focke-Wulf Fw 44
Focke-Wulf Fw 58
Nardi FN.305
Repülőgépgyár Levente II
Weiss WM-10 Ölyv

Transport aircraft 

 Messerschmitt Bf 108 Taifun
 Savoia-Marchetti SM.75

References

World War II Hungarian aircraft
Aircraft
Hungary